Solirubrobacter pauli  is a mesophilic Gram-positive and aerobic bacterium from the genus of Solirubrobacter which has been isolated from the earthworm Lumbricus rubellus from Athens in the United States.

References

External links 
Type strain of Solirubrobacter pauli at BacDive –  the Bacterial Diversity Metadatabase
 

Actinomycetota
Bacteria described in 2003